Schistopterini is a tribe of tephritid  or fruit flies in the family Tephritidae.

Genera
Bactropota Bezzi, 1924
Brachiopterna Bezzi, 1924
Clematochaeta Hering, 1941
Cordylopteryx Hering, 1941
Eutretosoma Hendel, 1968
Heringomyia Hendel, 1968
Pararhabdochaeta Hardy, 1985
Rhabdochaeta Meijere, 1904
Rhochmopterum Speiser, 1910
Schistopterum Becker, 1902

References

Tephritinae
Diptera tribes